J. David Sapir, son of Edward Sapir, is a linguist, anthropologist and photographer. He is Emeritus professor of Anthropology at the University of Virginia. He is known for his research on Jola languages. He has been editor of the journal Visual Anthropology Review

Selected publications
 2011. A Grammar of Diola-Fogny: A Language Spoken in the Basse-Casamance Region of Senegal. Cambridge University Press
1994 - On Fixing Ethnographic Shadows American Ethnologist 21 (4):867-885.
 1981 The Social Use of Metaphor: Essays on the Anthropology of Rhetoric. 1977. (with J. C. Crocker, eds.) Philadelphia: University of Pennsylvania Press.
1981 - Kujaama, Symbolic Separation among the Diola-Fogny. American Anthropologist 72 (6):1330-48.
1981 - Hyenas, Lepers and Blacksmiths in Kujamaat Social Thought. American Ethnologist 8 (3):526-43.
1981 - Fecal Animals, an Example of Complementary Totemism. Man 12:1-21.
1965 - The Music of the Diola-Fogny of the Casamance, Sénégal New York: Folkways Records.

References

External links
http://fixingshadows.net/
http://people.virginia.edu/~ds8s/Kujamaat-Joola/

Living people
American anthropologists
Linguists from the United States
American photographers
Jola languages
University of Virginia faculty
Year of birth missing (living people)
Jewish anthropologists